Lansdowne County was one of the 26 counties of Western Australia that were designated in 1829 as cadastral divisions. It was named after Henry Petty-Fitzmaurice, 3rd Marquess of Lansdowne, Secretary of State for the Home Department from 1827-1828. It approximately corresponds to the Jilbadji Land District which was gazetted in 1903 and forms the basis for land titles in the area.

References

Counties of Western Australia